Lev Razumovsky (1926 – 2006) was a Russian sculptor, painter, graphic artist, medal and toy designer, and writer.

Biography 
Lev Razumovsky was born in Leningrad, USSR on May 1, 1926.

He survived the Siege of Leningrad. In 1943, aged 17, he was drafted to the army, was seriously wounded in a battle near Petrozavodsk losing his left arm.

In 1945, despite his disability, he entered the Leningrad College of Art and Design (now the Saint Petersburg Art and Industry Academy) to become a sculptor.

 

His diploma work, the Pilot (cast bronze, 1953), was installed in Victory Park in Leningrad, now St. Petersburg.

In 1955, Razumovsky was admitted to the Union of Artists of Russia. In sculpture, he worked in various genres: monuments, park sculpture, portraits, compositions, small-size sculpture, and medals. War and the Holocaust were major themes in his work. Five sculptures by Lev Razumovsky have been acquired by the Russian Museum in St. Petersburg.

Bulat Okudzhava wrote a letter to Lev Razumovsky about his sculpture composition "The Roads of War" (1980):

 

Lev Razumovsky was a professional toy designer: his toys were produced in large quantities by toy factories of Leningrad and Moscow.

He took part in numerous exhibitions – local, national and international.

His works are displayed in Russian museums and in private collections in Russia, Finland, Sweden, Denmark, the Netherlands, Germany, Hungary, Israel, and the US.

His memoirs about the siege and the army were published in the 1990s. He has also written about 100 short stories.

In 1997, a video was made by Alexander Gref where Lev demonstrates self-invented devices helping one-armed people to manage in everyday life without having to ask someone for help. Initially, this video was meant as an aid for disabled people. In 2011, it was used for a short documentary Life of Full Value.

Andrew Bernhardt, London:

Works

Notes

Bibliography 
 Нас время учило // Нева, 1995, № 11-12 (in Russian) We Learned from the Times. War memoirs. The Neva magazine No. 11-12, 1995. 
 Дети блокады // Нева, 1999, № 1 (in Russian) Children of the Siege. Memoirs. The Neva magazine No. 9, 1999. 
 Памяти Володи Татаровича // Крещатик, 2002, № 15 (in Russian) In Memory of Volodya Tatarovich. The Kreschatik magazine No. 15, 2002. 
 Паренек из Великих Лук // Нева, 2004, № 9 (in Russian) The Chap from Velikie Luki. The Neva magazine No. 9, 2004. 
 Моя коллекция (in Russian) My Collection. Short stories.

References

External links 
 Official website
  documentary with English subtitles
 Лев Разумовский. Жизнь и творчество // «Стороны света», № 9 Lev Razumovsky. Life and Work. The Stosvet magazine No. 9
 Дарья Соболева. Львы ленинградской игрушки // Антиквариат, 2011, № 4 (85) The Lions of the Soviet Toys by Daria Soboleva. The Antiques magazine No. 4, 2011
 Татьяна Разумовская. Об отце, художнике Л. С. Разумовском // Лексикон, 2011, № 61 Tatiana Razumovskaya about her father. The Lexicon magazine No. 61, 2011

Soviet sculptors
Russian male sculptors
20th-century sculptors
20th-century Russian painters
21st-century Russian painters
Russian male painters
1926 births
2006 deaths
20th-century Russian male artists
21st-century Russian male artists